State Route 110 (SR-110) is a state highway in the U.S. state of Utah, connecting SR-127 in Syracuse with SR-37 in West Point. The highway is routed entirely on 4500 West.

Route description
SR-110 follows 4500 West in the Weber Valley, near the east shore of the Great Salt Lake and west of the Hooper Canal.

History
State Route 195 was created in 1935, running west and north from what was then the end of SR-108 in Syracuse through West Point to the then-end of SR-37 in Hooper. An extension of SR-37 cut back the north end of SR-195 to a point west of Clinton in 1945, and in 1947 the latter route was removed from the state highway system. The portion of SR-195 heading west from SR-108 was restored in 1965 as part of SR-127, and in 1969 a new SR-110 brought the remainder of old SR-195 back onto the system.

Major intersections

References

110
 110
Streets in Utah